Oligophrenin-1 is a protein that in humans is encoded by the OPHN1 gene.

Function 

Oligophrenin 1 has 25 exons and encodes a Rho-GTPase-activating protein. The Rho proteins are important mediators of intracellular signal transduction, which affects cell migration and cell morphogenesis.

The role of OPHN1 in the medial prefrontal cortex in the behavioural responses to stress, and learned helplessness-inducing effect of OPHN1 deletion in parvalbumin interneurons, is of recent research interest. It is also involved in regulation in inhibitory interneurons in the olfactory bulb.

Clinical significance 

Mutations in this gene are responsible for non-specific X-linked intellectual disability (previously called mental retardation). 

OPHN1 syndrome is a rare disorder characterized by intellectual disability and changes in the part of the brain which controls movement and balance (cerebellum). The syndrome mainly affects males. It is characterized by low muscle tone (hypotonia), developmental and cognitive delay, early-onset seizures, abnormal behavior, characteristic facial features (long face, bulging forehead, under eye creases, deep set eyes, and large ears), crossed eyes (strabismus) and inability to coordinate movements.
  A small cerebellum and large ventricles can be seen on brain imaging (MRI). Treatment is supportive and includes physical, occupational and speech and language therapy.
In 2014 an OPHN1 patient organization and website was formed to support families and promote OPHN1 syndrome research. 

OPHN1 syndrome is caused by mutations in the OPHN1 gene, which is located on the  X chromosome. Inheritance is X-linked. Some females who carry a mutation in the OPHN1 gene may have mild learning disabilities, mild cognitive impairment, strabismus, and subtle facial changes.

References

Further reading